The Lancashire Wildlife Trust or Wildlife Trust for Lancashire, Manchester and North Merseyside is a wildlife trust covering the county of Lancashire and parts of Greater Manchester and Merseyside in England.

It includes all of the ceremonial county of Lancashire, including the unitary authority districts of Blackburn with Darwen and Blackpool; from Greater Manchester the districts of Bolton, Bury, Manchester, Oldham, Rochdale, Salford and Wigan; and from Merseyside the districts of Liverpool, Sefton, Knowsley and St Helens. It also covers adjacent areas of the Irish Sea including parts of Morecambe Bay and Liverpool Bay.

The trust is part of the Wildlife Trusts partnership, which is the UK's leading conservation charity dedicated to all wildlife. The network of 47 local Wildlife Trusts and its junior branch, Wildlife Watch, work together with local communities to protect wildlife in all habitats across the UK, in towns, countryside, wetlands and seas.

The trust was formed as the Lancashire Naturalists' Trust in 1962 by a group of naturalists who wanted to help protect the wildlife of Lancashire. It is now the leading local environmental charity in this region. Following the local government reforms of 1974 it transferred its remit and tenure in Furness to the newly constituted Cumbria Wildlife Trust. It was renamed the Lancashire Trust for Nature Conservation in 1980, and the Lancashire Wildlife Trust in 1992. The Charity Commission's record also lists The Lancashire Trust for Nature Conservation with Greater Manchester and Merseyside as a former name, and The Wildlife Trust (Lancashire, Manchester, N. Merseyside) as a working name.

The trust's mission is to work for a region richer in wildlife by the protection and enhancement of species and habitats, both common and rare; and to work towards public recognition that a healthy environment rich in wildlife and managed on sustainable principles, is essential for continued human existence.

The trust's HQ and Lancashire Office is in Cuerden Valley Park south of Bamber Bridge, near Preston. Its Greater Manchester Office is in east Bolton and its Merseyside Office is within the Port of Liverpool.

Projects 

The Trust's projects include the Brockholes nature reserve, near Preston, which opened in 2011 on a former quarry site near junction 31 of the M6 motorway and has an award-winning floating visitor centre.

References

External links
Lancashire, Manchester and North Merseyside Wildlife Trust website
 Brockholes Nature Reserve
 Brockholes in the Guardian Newspaper

Environment of Lancashire
Environment of Merseyside
Environment of Greater Manchester
Irish Sea
Wildlife Trusts of England
1962 establishments in England